Deh Khan (also Romanized as Deh Khān; also known as Dehqān) is a village in Takab Rural District, Shahdad District, Kerman County, Kerman Province, Iran. At the 2006 census, its population was 125, in 30 families.

References 

Populated places in Kerman County